McDowell County Courthouse may refer to:

 McDowell County Courthouse (North Carolina), listed on the NRHP in North Carolina
 McDowell County Courthouse (West Virginia), listed on the NRHP in West Virginia